The Netherlands Office Taipei represents interests of the Netherlands in Taiwan in the absence of formal diplomatic relations, functioning as a de facto embassy. Its counterpart in the Netherlands is the Taipei Representative Office in the Netherlands in The Hague.

History
The representative office was established in 1981 as the Netherlands Council for Trade Promotion, later Netherlands Trade and Investment Office, a private foundation, but dependent on the Ministry of Economic Affairs for 70 per cent of its funding. In April 2020, it was renamed to Netherlands Office Taipei.
 
It also has a Visa and Consular Department, which handles all visa applications and consular matters for Taiwan.
 
The Office is headed by the Representative, Guido Tielman, who was appointed in August 2020.

Transportation
The office is accessible within walking distance south of Taipei City Hall Station of Taipei Metro.

See also
 List of diplomatic missions in Taiwan
 List of diplomatic missions of the Netherlands

References

External links

Taipei
1981 establishments in Taiwan
Representative Offices in Taipei
Organizations established in 1981
Finance in the Netherlands
Netherlands–Taiwan relations